James Monroe (July 18, 1821 – July 6, 1898) was an American politician who served five terms as a U.S. Representative from Ohio from 1871 to 1881.

Early life
Born in Plainfield, Connecticut, Monroe attended the common schools and Plainfield Academy. He was graduated from Oberlin College in 1846.  He pursued a postgraduate course in theology and was a professor at Oberlin College from 1849–1862.

Career
He served as a member of the Ohio House of Representatives in 1856–1859.  He served in the Ohio Senate from 1860–1862, during which time he was chosen to serve as president pro tempore from 1861 and 1862.

In October 1862, he resigned his seat in the Senate to accept the position of United States Consul in Rio de Janeiro and served from 1863 to 1869.  Following that, he served for several months in 1869 as Chargé D'Affaires ad interim to Brazil.

Monroe was elected as a Republican to the Forty-second and to the four succeeding Congresses (March 4, 1871 – March 3, 1881).  He served as chairman of the Committee on Education and Labor (Forty-third Congress) and was not a candidate for renomination.

Later career
After his terms in the House of Representatives, he returned to Oberlin College as a professor from 1883–1896.

Personal life
He was married twice, first to Elizabeth Maxwell (1825-1862), and later to Julia Finney (1837-1930). He had four children, including:
Mary Katherine Monroe (1851-1891)
Charles Edwin Monroe (1861-1947)

He died in Oberlin, Ohio, July 6, 1898 and was interred in Westwood Cemetery.

Legacy
The house in which Monroe and his wife Julia lived when they returned to Oberlin from his consul appointment in Rio de Janeiro is currently preserved as part of the Oberlin Heritage Center.  The current interior of the house presents decor and information from the 1860s, 1870s, and 1880s, and uses Monroe's commitments to education and the abolition of slavery to highlight important events in the history of the city of Oberlin.

Writings

References

External links

 
 "Monroe House."  Oberlin Heritage Center.  Retrieved 2015-09-30.

1821 births
1898 deaths
People from Plainfield, Connecticut
American Congregationalists
American consuls
Republican Party members of the Ohio House of Representatives
Presidents of the Ohio State Senate
Republican Party Ohio state senators
People from Oberlin, Ohio
19th-century American diplomats
Oberlin College alumni
Oberlin College faculty
19th-century American politicians
Republican Party members of the United States House of Representatives from Ohio